

Location 
San Borja is the seat of the San Borja Municipality, the second municipal section of the José Ballivián Province. The city is located at an elevation of 197 m on the left bank of Río Maniqui, a tributary of Río Rapulo which flows into Río Mamoré.

Geography 
San Borja sits on the far southwestern edge of the Llanos de Moxos. San Borja straddles the transition zone from flat mosaics of floodplains and forest islands, to Southwestern Amazonian Rainforest. San Borja's orography is generally homogenous and flat.

San Borja has a tropical monsoon climate, type (Am) in the Köppen classification system bordering on a tropical rainforest climate. Rain is plentiful but divided between a distinct wet and dry season. Like many areas in Bolivia and Latin America generally, San Borja is subject to considerable fluctuations in seasonal and annual precipitation, particularly as a consequence of climate-change related anomalies.

Transport 
By road, San Borja is situated 230 km west of the department's capital, Trinidad.

San Borja is connected towards the southwest with Yucumo situated on the road and a bus route La Paz - Yolosa/Coroico - Caranavi - Rurrenabaque. Yucumo is halfway between Caranavi and Rurrenabaque. Towards the east of San Borja Route 3 leads to San Ignacio de Moxos and farther to Trinidad, the capital of the Beni Department.

The airport of San Borja has regular services from two airlines: Línea Aérea Amaszonas and TAM - Transporte Aéreo Militar (the Bolivian Military Airline)

San Borja is a city in the Beni Department in northern Bolivia, It is the most populous city in the province of General José Ballivián.

Population 
The town's population has increased strongly over the past three decades:
1976: 4,613 inhabitants (census)
1992: 11,072 inhabitants (census)
2001: 16,273 inhabitants (census)
2010: 24,610 inhabitants (est.)

In spite of high migration figures over the past decades, the city still has a noteworthy percentage of indigenous population; 17.7 percent of the San Borja Municipality population speak local indigenous languages.

Maps
www.mirabolivia.com/mapas (four different types)
www.mirabolivia.com/mapa_muestra.php?id_mapa=12 (road map sheet showing San Borja and Yucumo)

References

External links
Map of Ballivián Province
Satellite map at Maplandia.com

Populated places in Beni Department
Jesuit Missions of Moxos